Catherine Mary Harris  is an Australian company director. She has served as Chairperson of Harris Farm Markets since 1999.

Career
Harris graduated from the University of New South Wales with a Bachelor of Commerce. Following university Harris worked for both David Jones and Grace Bros. In 1971, Harris co-founded Harris Farm Markets with her husband, David.

She has previously held roles as the Deputy Chancellor UNSW 1999-2003; chief executive and Director of the Affirmative Action Agency;  chief executive of Harris Communications (International Marketing Company); chair of Mary Rossi Travel Pty Ltd; and chair of the now closed St Margaret's Public and Private Hospital.

Harris currently serves as a director of the National Gallery of Australia, The Australian Ballet, UNSW Business School, the Museum of Contemporary Art Australia, the Australia Japan Foundation and as a Trustee of the Sydney Cricket and Sports Ground Trust. She has served as Honorary Consul of Bhutan in Sydney since 2 June 2004. Harris is a governor of the University of Notre Dame Australia. In February 2012 she was appointed to Australian Rugby League Commission.

Honours and awards
In 2000 Harris was awarded the Public Service Medal (PSM) "for outstanding public service as Director of the Commonwealth's Affirmative Action Agency and her role in the acceptance of affirmative action by Australia's business community." She was awarded the Centenary Medal on 1 January 2001 "for service to Australian society in business leadership".

In 2006 Harris was appointed an Officer of the Order of Australia (AO) "for service to community development through leadership roles in organisations related to education, health care, advancement of the status of women, the Catholic Church, the arts and sport, and to international relations between Australia and Asia, particularly support for Bhutanese people living in Australia."

The UNSW Business School awarded Harris with an Honorary Doctorate of Business (Hon.D.Bus) in 2008; and she is a Fellow of the Australian Institute of Company Directors (FAICD).

Personal life
Harris is a Roman Catholic, is married to David whom she met while completing her undergraduate degree, and together they have five sons.

References

Living people
Australian Rugby League Commissioners
Australian chief executives
Businesspeople from Sydney
Australian women in business
Officers of the Order of Australia
Australian women diplomats
Bhutanese diplomats
Australia–Bhutan relations
Recipients of the Public Service Medal (Australia)
Recipients of the Centenary Medal
University of New South Wales alumni
Year of birth missing (living people)
Fellows of the Australian Institute of Company Directors